The jadagan (Khakas: чадыған, chadyghan, Russian: чатхан, çatkhan, or Siberian harp) is a wooden board zither of the Khakass Turkic people of Russian Siberia, usually with 6 or 7 strings stretched across movable bridges and tuned a fourth or fifth apart. The body is hollowed out from underneath like an upturned trough. It has a convex surface and an end bent towards the ground. The strings are plucked and the sound is very smooth. The instrument was considered to be sacrosanct and playing it was a rite bound to taboos. The instrument was mainly used at court and in monasteries, since strings symbolised the twelve levels of the palace hierarchy.

In the West
Folklorist Nancy Thym-Hochrein has researched the instrument, and musician Raphael De Cock is a contemporary player.

Related instruments
Yatga: Mongolia 
koto: Japan
Guzheng: China
Zither
Se: China
Gayageum: Korea
Đàn tranh: Vietnam
Kanun (instrument)
Kanklės: Lithuania
Jetigen: Kazakhstan 
Ajaeng: Korea
Yazheng: China

Notes

Box zithers
Khakas
Tuvan musical instruments
Turkic music